Lo-Ex is an aluminium alloy with a very small thermal expansion co-efficient. It contains approximately 14 per cent silicon, 2 per cent nickel, and 1 per cent each of copper and magnesium.

Applications

It has been used extensively and successfully over the years for all types of piston, including in Hillman Imp, and Terraplane  engines.

LM13 is a related alloy in the Lo-Ex series, also widely used for diesel engine pistons. This alloy contains 12% silicon, 1% copper and 1% magnesium. Both of these alloys have also been used in a strengthened form, reinforced by an MMC or hybrid composite of alumina or zirconium ceramic fibres. These alloys have been worked by squeeze casting or stir casting.

References

Aluminium alloys
Aluminium–silicon alloys